Number 8 was a bus route that runs between Watford and Mount Vernon Hospital. It is operated by Arriva Kent Thameside.

History 
In 2012, stops within Kingswood were withdrawn. Following a withdrawal in subsidies, journeys after 7:30 pm were withdrawn.

From 17 April 2022, the northern section of the route from Abbots Langley to Watford was withdrawn. The withdrawn section was partially replaced by a new council-supported route, number 9.

In September 2022, it was announced that the route would be withdrawn after 30 October. It was replaced with a new route, 508, which operates between Hemel Hempstead and Mount Vernon Hospital.

References 

Bus routes in England
Transport in Hertfordshire